Kobena Mercer (born 1960) is a British art historian and writer on contemporary art and visual culture. His writing on Robert Mapplethorpe and Rotimi Fani-Kayode has been described as "among the most incisive (and delightful to read) critiques of simple identity-based politics in the field of cultural studies."

Life and work
Mercer was born in  London in 1960. He was educated in Ghana and England and graduated with a bachelor's degree in Fine Art at Saint Martins School of Art. He gained his doctorate by completing a PhD at Goldsmiths College in 1990.

Much of Mercer's writing has focused on the work and cultural context of black British artists, including monographs for Keith Piper, Rotimi Fani-Kayode and Hew Locke – as well as on contemporary and modern art of the African Diaspora more widely. He has contributed essays to numerous anthologies in the fields of cultural studies and contemporary art, including his own, groundbreaking volume, Welcome to the Jungle: New Positions in Black Cultural Studies, published in 1994. Mercer was commissioned to contribute "New Practices, New Identities: Hybridity and Globalization," the closing chapter in the epic series The Image of the Black in Western Art, Volume V, The Twentieth Century (Harvard University Press, 2014). 

In 2006, Mercer won the inaugural Clark Prize for excellence in art writing. Alongside his work as a writer, Mercer also has a distinguished international career as an academic, teaching first at Middlesex University and, more recently, as Professor of History of Art and African American Studies at Yale. It was announced in February 2021 that Bard College had appointed Mercer the Charles P. Stevenson Chair in Art History and the Humanities, and that he would assume the position in fall 2021.

Selected bibliography

"New Practices, New Identities: Hybridity and Globalization" in

Notes

External links
Yale website
 InIVA website
"Previous Clark Prize Recipients", Clark Art Institute website

Living people
1960 births
English art critics
English art historians
Alumni of Saint Martin's School of Art
Alumni of the Royal College of Art
Black British writers
Black British artists
English people of Ghanaian descent
Alumni of Goldsmiths, University of London